Péchabou is a commune in the Haute-Garonne department in southwestern France, Occitanie. The inhabitants are called the Pechabolites and the Pechabolites.

Population
As of 2017, the commune had 2,330 inhabitants, an increase of 45% compared to 2007.

See also
Communes of the Haute-Garonne department

References

External links
 Official Site

Communes of Haute-Garonne